Richard Rich, 1st Baron Rich (1496–1567) was Lord Chancellor of England.

Richard Rich may also refer to:

 Richard Rich (filmmaker) (fl. from 1969), an American director, producer, and screenwriter
 Richard Rich (Sheriff of London) (died c. 1464)
 Richard Rich Sr., father of fictional character Richie Rich (Richard $ Rich Jr.)

See also

 Richie Rich (disambiguation)